Stará Ľubovňa District (okres Stará Ľubovňa) is a district in
the Prešov Region of eastern Slovakia. 
Until 1918, the district was almost entirely part of the county of Kingdom of Hungary of Spiš, apart from a small area in the
east which formed part of the county of Šariš.

Municipalities

Čirč
Ďurková
Forbasy
Hajtovka
Haligovce
Hniezdne
Hraničné
Hromoš
Chmeľnica
Jakubany
Jarabina
Kamienka
Kolačkov
Kremná
Kyjov
Lacková
Legnava
Lesnica
Litmanová
Lomnička
Ľubotín
Malý Lipník
Matysová
Mníšek nad Popradom
Nižné Ružbachy
Nová Ľubovňa
Obručné
Orlov
Plaveč
Plavnica
Podolínec
Pusté Pole
Ruská Voľa nad Popradom
Stará Ľubovňa
Starina
Stráňany
Sulín
Šambron
Šarišské Jastrabie
Údol
Veľká Lesná
Veľký Lipník
Vislanka
Vyšné Ružbachy

References 

Districts of Slovakia
Geography of Prešov Region